Out to the World is a 1994 South Korean black-comedy film.

Synopsis
A satirical allegory of contemporary South Korean politics, the film follows the exploits of two convicts who accidentally escape while being transferred to another prison. Before they can turn themselves back into custody, they meet a female outlaw. She persuades the pair of prisoners to rob a bank in Seoul. When their robbery turns into an embarrassing fiasco, the two decide to flee to the North Korean border.

Cast
 Moon Sung-keun... Sung-keun
 Lee Geung-young... Geung-young
 Shim Hye-jin... Hye-jin
 Lee Dong-jin... Congressman
 Yang Hee-kyung... Gas Station Attendant
 Park Young-pal... Storekeeper
 Myung Gye-nam... Lieutenant
 Kim Ha-rim 
 Kwon Hae-hyo 
 Lee Du-il

Awards
 Grand Bell Awards (1995) Best New Director (Yeo Kyun-dong)

Notes

Bibliography
 
 
 
 

1994 films
1990s Korean-language films
South Korean black comedy films
Films directed by Yeo Kyun-dong